Henham Park is an historic  estate in the parish of Wangford with Henham, situated north of the village of Blythburgh in the English county of Suffolk. The park is bordered to the east by the A12 road and to the west by the A145, the two roads meeting to the south of the estate.. It was historically the seat of the Earl of Stradbroke. In 1953 the 4th Earl demolished the Georgian manor house, known as Henham Hall.

The estate's current owner is Keith Rous, 6th Earl of Stradbroke (b. 1937), formerly of Mount Fyan's Station, Dundonnell, Victoria, Australia, a 5,900 hectare (14,580 acre) ranch which he purchased in 1989 and sold in 2016 for $ Aus 34 million (£19 million). In 2006 a major £60 million redevelopment plan was announced by Hektor Rous, the estate manager and a younger son of the 6th Earl, including the building of a large hotel. The park is the venue for the Latitude Festival of arts and music and plays host to other events throughout the year.

History

Hunting park
The original Henham lands were hunting grounds in the historic civil parish of Henham, the seat of the de la Poles Earls of Suffolk, of Wingfield Castle in Suffolk, on which a timber-framed structure was built with its own protective moatyard.

However in 1513 King Henry VIII ordered the execution of Edmund de la Pole, and granted the property to his friend Charles Brandon, 1st Duke of Suffolk, who built a new mansion house  in front of the old mediaeval timber-framed structure, in fine Tudor style. The house had extensive walled gardens on two sides and enclosed a large courtyard. In 1538 there is a record of a deer park here. 

On Brandon's death in 1545, the Crown granted Henham to Sir Arthur Hopton of Blythburgh who immediately sold the estate to Sir Anthony Rous, Knight, of Dennington, near Stradbroke in Suffolk. In 1575 Christopher Saxton represented Henham with a small icon of a park on his map of Suffolk.

In 1773, while Sir John Rous, 6th Baronet (from 1821 1st Earl of Stradbroke) was away on a Grand Tour of Venice, his drunken butler had a mishap with a candle, which caused a fire that destroyed the building. The £30,000 loss represented eight years' income from the estate, and the substantial blow meant that it was to be twenty years before he could afford to rebuild.

This structure was the subject of an episode of the Channel 4 television series Time Team in January 2013.

Georgian hall

In 1790 Sir John, later the first Earl of Stradbroke, commissioned James Wyatt to build a new hall,  in front of the second hall, with accompanying parkland design by Humphrey Repton. An impressive structure, in 1858 Augusta Bonham wife of the second Earl instructed architect Edward Barry to give it a Victorian gloss; the work was carried out by Lucas Brothers.

This hall was demolished by the fourth Earl of Stradbroke in 1953, despite attempts by his brother, later the fifth Earl, to keep the house intact. One wall remains, with a frieze depicting a Native American fighting a bear.

A horse mill used to operate on the estate, one of only two known in Suffolk. This is now preserved at the Museum of East Anglian Life at Stowmarket.

Present
The fourth Earl died in 1983 with his brother becoming the fifth Earl for only four days before also dying. Robert Keith Rous – at that time a businessman and sheep grazier in Australia – then inherited Henham and became the sixth Earl of Stradbroke. This was, however, not without difficulty and a protracted court battle led to a family feud.

Events and other uses

The estate hosts the Wings and Wheels and Grand Henham Steam Rally as well as remaining a working farm. Every July it hosts Latitude Festival, an annual arts festival of music, theatre and comedy which 40,000 people attend. There is a brewery and bed and breakfast accommodation located on the site as well as a series of walking trails.

References

External links

Henham Park 100 miles from London — Milestones Web

Gardens in Suffolk
Country houses in Suffolk
Waveney District
Suffolk Coastal
British country houses destroyed in the 20th century
Edward Middleton Barry buildings